Ben Jarvis may refer to:
 Ben Jarvis (politician)
 Ben Jarvis (footballer)